The 2014 Army Black Knights football team represented the United States Military Academy as an independent in the 2014 NCAA Division I FBS football season. The Black Knights were led by first-year head coach Jeff Monken and played their home games at Michie Stadium. They finished the season 4–8.

Schedule

Game summaries

Buffalo

at Stanford

at Wake Forest

at Yale

Ball State

Rice

at Kent State

Air Force

vs. UConn

at WKU

Fordham

vs. Navy

References

Army
Army Black Knights football seasons
Army Black Knights football